Udea ennychioides is a moth of the family Crambidae. It is endemic to the Hawaiian islands of Kauai, Oahu and Maui.

External links

Moths described in 1881
Endemic moths of Hawaii
ennychioides